Exit the Dragon is the fifth album by American alternative rock group Urge Overkill, released in 1995. Exit the Dragon is characterized as being a darker album than their previous album, Saturation. It was their final album until 2011 saw the release of Rock & Roll Submarine, sixteen years after Exit the Dragon.

Production
The album was produced by the Butcher Bros.

Critical reception
The Los Angeles Times wrote that the album's "fab pop tunes are as cheesily amusing as a dubbed karate movie. But when the kitsch clears, you have to wonder whether the band ... has anything of its own to offer." The Chicago Tribune praised "the kind of understated, seemingly casual performances that bespeak a band less interested in dazzle than emotional immediacy, with sturdy melodies, raggedly poignant vocals and brooding lyrics."

Track listing

Personnel
Eddie "King" Roeser – vocals, bass guitar, guitars
Nash Kato – vocals, guitars, keyboards
Blackie Onassis – drums, vocals

Charts

References

1995 albums
Geffen Records albums
Urge Overkill albums